Nightflyers is an American horror science fiction television series on Syfy that premiered in the United States on December 2, 2018, and on Netflix, internationally on February 1, 2019. The series is based on the novella and series of short stories of the same name by George R. R. Martin. The first season consisted of ten episodes, which concluded on December 13, 2018. Syfy canceled the series in February 2019.

Premise 
In 2093, a team of scientists embark on a journey into space aboard an advanced space ship called the Nightflyer; in order to make first contact with alien life-forms. When terrifyingly violent events begin to occur aboard, the team begins to question each other, but come to the realization that there must be something else on board the Nightflyer with them. It is up to the crew to save the ship themselves, to complete their mission.

Cast

Main
 Eoin Macken as Karl d’Branin, an astrophysicist and leader of the Nightflyer expedition
 David Ajala as Roy Eris, the reclusive captain of the Nightflyer
Jodie Turner-Smith as Melantha Jhirl
 Angus Sampson as Rowan, a xenobiologist
 Sam Strike as Thale, an L-1 telepath
 Maya Eshet as Lommie Thorne, a cyberneticist who communicates with the Nightflyers computers via a neuro-port surgically implanted in her arm
 Brían F. O'Byrne as Auggie, chief engineer of the Nightflyer
 Gretchen Mol as Agatha Matheson, a psychiatrist who specializes in working with telepaths

Recurring
 Phillip Rhys as Murphy
 Gwynne McElveen as Dr. Tobis
 Zoë Tapper as Joy d'Branin
 Miranda Raison as Tessia
 Bronte Carmichael as Skye d'Branin
 Youssef Kerkour as Hartley Suczek
 Joplin Sibtain as Lommie's father
 Josette Simon as Cynthia
 Brielle Olaleye as young Cynthia
 Daniel Adegboyega as Henry Eris
 Olwen Fouéré as Connie
 Ned Dennehy as Captain Judson

Production

Development 
In 2016, Syfy began developing a series based on Martin's novella after its acquisition. The series is also based on the film adaptation from 1987. George R. R. Martin was not involved directly with the series due to his exclusive contract with HBO, but was credited as an executive producer.

Filming 
The series started its production in early 2018 on location in Limerick, Ireland, and also at the Limerick-based Troy Studios, with Daniel Cerone serving as the showrunner. Cerone also serves as a series executive producer, along with Gene Klein, David Bartis, and Doug Liman of Hypnotic; Alison Rosenzweig and Michael Gaeta of Gaeta Rosenzweig Films; and Lloyd Ivan Miller and Alice P. Neuhauser of Lloyd Ivan Miller Productions.

For the visual effects, Spin VFX is the main vendor, with Territory Studio supplying user interfaces and Switch Visual Effects providing additional support. The visual effects have to work seamlessly with the huge practical set built for the ship.

Episodes

Release 

Netflix joined the series as a co-producer, and holds international airing rights in addition to secondary airing rights in the United States. Nightflyers premiered on Syfy on December 2, 2018. The first season consisted of ten episodes. The first season became available to stream on Netflix worldwide on February 1, 2019. Syfy canceled the series in February 2019.

Reception

Critical response
On review aggregation website Rotten Tomatoes, the series has an approval rating of 33% based on 27 reviews, with an average rating of 5.41/10. The website's critical consensus reads: "Unsettling without being particularly scary, Nightflyers's low-budget aesthetics and over-reliance on homage betray its intriguing philosophical pondering and impressive creative pedigree". Metacritic, which uses a weighted average, assigned a score of 47 out of 100 based on 14 critics, indicating "mixed or average reviews".

Alex McLevy of The A.V. Club was disappointed that the show does not do more to upend genre conventions the way Game of Thrones successfully did, writing "the showrunner Jeff Buhler doesn’t quite know how to make it feel new again". McLevy praised the show for its "appealing visual style" despite budgetary limitations, and of the acting cast he singled out Maya Eshet, "who elevates every scene in which she appears". He compared the show to the film Event Horizon and called the show engaging but lacking depth, suggesting the show may appeal more to those who already enjoy the sci-fi horror genre.

Ratings

Accolades

References

External links
  at Syfy
 

2018 American television series debuts
2018 American television series endings
2010s American science fiction television series
English-language Netflix original programming
Space adventure television series
Television series about extraterrestrial life
Syfy original programming
Television shows based on American novels
Television shows filmed in the Republic of Ireland
Television series by Universal Television